Kamień Łukawski (literally "Rock Lukawski") is an estate in the administrative district of Gmina Dwikozy, within Sandomierz County, Świętokrzyskie Voivodeship, in south-central Poland.

The village has a population of 130.

References

Villages in Sandomierz County